Steriphoma peruvianum is a species of flowering plant in the Capparaceae family. It is native to Peru.

Capparaceae
Plants described in 1865